Buddleja fallowiana is a species of flowering plant in the figwort family Scrophulariaceae. It is endemic to the Yunnan province of western China, where it grows in open woodland, along forest edges and watercourses.  The plant was collected in China by the Scottish botanist George Forrest in 1906, and named in 1917 by Balfour & Smith for George Fallow, a gardener at the Royal Botanic Garden Edinburgh. Fallow had died in Egypt in 1915 from wounds sustained fighting in the Gallipoli Campaign.

Description
Of loose habit, the plant has young shoots clothed with a dense white felt. The inflorescences are slender, thyrsoid, sometimes interrupted, with panicles at the ends of the current year's shoots. The flowers bloom in late summer and autumn.

Growth is significantly slower than that of B. davidii; Bean considered the species more closely allied to B. nivea, although its chromosome number, 2n = 76 (tetraploid), places it alongside the similarly tetraploid B. davidii.

Cultivation
Somewhat tender, B. fallowiana is best grown against a wall. However, if cut to the ground by frost, it will grow again from the base. Hardiness: USDA zones 8–9.

Varieties
Buddleja fallowiana var. alba. 
The variety was considered horticulturally superior to B. fallowiana by Bean, who thought it one of the most attractive of all Buddlejas; it was accorded the Royal Horticultural Society's Award of Garden Merit in 1993.  However, its varietal status was challenged by Leeuwenberg, who considered its colouration insufficient to justify it as a variety, and sank it as simply B. fallowiana.

Hybrid cultivars
A number of hybrid cultivars have been raised, invariably through a crossing of the species with Buddleja davidii:
Buddleja 'Lochinch'
Buddleja 'Mayford Purple'
Buddleja 'Vashon Skies'
Buddleja 'West Hill'

References

Li, P. T. & Leeuwenberg, A. J. M. (1996). Loganiaceae, in Wu, Z. & Raven, P. (eds) Flora of China, Vol. 15. Science Press, Beijing, and Missouri Botanical Garden Press, St. Louis, USA.  online at www.efloras.org

fallowiana
Flora of China
Taxa named by Isaac Bayley Balfour
Taxa named by William Wright Smith